Qizhou or Qi Prefecture was a zhou (prefecture) in imperial China centering on modern Jinan, Shandong, China. It existed (intermittently) from 469 until 1116.

References
 

Prefectures of Later Han (Five Dynasties)
Prefectures of the Tang dynasty
Prefectures of the Sui dynasty
Prefectures of Later Tang
Prefectures of Later Liang (Five Dynasties)
Prefectures of Later Jin (Five Dynasties)
Prefectures of the Song dynasty
Former prefectures in Shandong
Prefectures of Later Zhou